Polytechnic University of the Philippines Quezon City (abbreviated as PUPQC; also known as PUP Commonwealth Campus) is one of the satellite campuses of the Polytechnic University of the Philippines located in Commonwealth, Quezon City, Philippines. It was established in 1997. It confers undergraduate and diploma degrees.

History 
PUPQC was established through the generosity and benevolence of Walter Rothlehner, a German church leader who donated his property in Barangay Commonwealth, Quezon City to PUP. The campus lot with an area of 1.9 hectares is donated by SIKHAY, an association led by Rev. Fr. Joel Tabora. The PUP Open University was tasked to administer and maintain the campus and its facilities.

PUPQC was formally inaugurated on July 29, 1997. Although it was in existing prior to 1997, it only started its operations and formal classes after its inauguration.

References

External links 
 Polytechnic University of the Philippines Quezon City – Official website
 Polytechnic University of the Philippines Quezon City – PUPQC Online Community

Polytechnic University of the Philippines
State universities and colleges in Metro Manila
Universities and colleges in Quezon City
1997 establishments in the Philippines
Educational institutions established in 1997